
Taiping, Tai-p’ing, or Tai Ping most often refers to:

Chinese history
 Princess Taiping (died 713), Tang dynasty princess
 Taiping Rebellion (1850–1864), civil war in southern China
 Taiping Heavenly Kingdom (1851–1864), the rebel government during the Taiping Rebellion
 Taiping Prefecture, a prefecture during the Ming and Qing dynasties
SS Taiping (1926), a steam ship used by the Royal Navy
Taiping (steamer), a Chinese steamer that sank in 1949

Historical eras
Taiping (256–258), era name used by Sun Liang, emperor of Eastern Wu
Taiping (409–430), era name used by Feng Ba, emperor of Northern Yan
Taiping (485–491), era name used by Yujiulü Doulun, khan of Rouranro
Taiping (556–557), era name used by Emperor Jing of Liang
Taiping (617–622), era name used by Lin Shihong
Taiping (1021–1031), era name used by Emperor Shengzong of Liao
Taiping (1356–1358), era name used by Xu Shouhui

Places
 Taiping, Perak, a municipality in Perak, Malaysia
 Taiping Island, the largest of the Spratly Islands controlled by Republic of China on Taiwan
 Taiping Mountain, a mountain in Datong Township, Yilan County, Republic of China on Taiwan
 Taiping Lake (Anhui), a lake in Anhui, People's Republic of China on Mainland
 Taiping River, a river in Hebei, People's Republic of China on Mainland
 Taiping District, Taichung, a district in Taichung, Republic of China on Taiwan
 Taiping District, Fuxin, a district in Fuxin, Liaoning, People's Republic of China on Mainland

Subdistricts in China
Taiping Subdistrict, Dalian, in Pulandian District, Dalian, Liaoning
Taiping Subdistrict, Suzhou, in Xiangcheng District, Suzhou, Jiangsu
Taiping Subdistrict, Wenling, in Wenling, Zhejiang
Taiping Subdistrict, Linyi, in Hedong District, Linyi, Shandong
Taiping Subdistrict, Chaozhou, in Xiangqiao District, Chaozhou, Guangdong
Taiping Subdistrict, Zhaotong, in Zhaoyang District, Zhaotong, Yunnan
Taiping New City Subdistrict, in Anning, Yunnan

Towns in China
Taiping, Tongliang District, Chongqing, in Tongliang District, Chongqing
Taiping, Dianjiang County, in Dianjiang County, Chongqing
Taiping, Zhao'an County, in Zhao'an County, Fujian
Taiping, Nanping, in Nanping, Fujian
Taiping, Zhenyuan County, Gansu, in Zhenyuan County, Gansu
Taiping, Guangzhou, in Guangzhou, Guangdong
Taiping, Shixing County, in Shixing County, Guangdong
Taiping, Zhanjiang, in Zhanjiang, Guangdong
Taiping, Yangshan County, in Yangshan County, Guangdong
Taiping, Qingyuan, in Qingyuan, Guangdong
Taiping, Luoding, in Luoding, Guangdong
Taiping, Xinxing County, in Xinxing County, Guangdong
Taiping, Teng County, in Teng County, Guangxi
Taiping, Nanning, in Nanning, Guangxi
Taiping, Chongzuo, in Chongzuo, Guangxi
Taiping, Liucheng County, in Liucheng County, Guangxi
Taiping, Lingshan County, in Lingshan County, Guangxi
Taiping, Pingguo County, in Pingguo County, Guangxi
Taiping, Harbin, in Harbin, Heilongjiang
Taiping, Jixian County, in Jixian County, Shuangyashan, Heilongjiang
Taiping, Xixia County, in Xixia County, Henan
Taiping, Guangshui, in Guangshui, Suizhou, Hubei
Taiping, Zaoyang, in Zaoyang, Hubei
Taiping, Ningyuan County, in Ningyuan County, Hunan
Taiping, Shimen County, in Shimen County, Hunan
Taiping, Jiangsu, in Sihong County, Jiangsu
Taiping, Jiangxi, in Nanchang, Jiangxi
Taiping, Changchun, in Changchun, Jilin
Taiping, Lishu County, in Lishu County, Jilin
Taiping, Panshan County, in Panshan County, Liaoning
Taiping, Jingyang County, in Jingyang County, Shaanxi
Taiping, Juye County, in Juye County, Shandong
Taiping, Zoucheng, in Zoucheng, Shandong
Taiping, Jiyang County, in Jiyang County, Shandong
Taiping, Chengdu, in Chengdu, Sichuan
Taiping, Wanyuan, in Wanyuan, Sichuan
Taiping, Lushan County, Sichuan, in Lushan County, Sichuan
Taiping, Gulin County, in Gulin County, Sichuan
Taiping, Xingwen County, in Xingwen County, Sichuan
Taiping, Xichong County, in Xichong County, Sichuan
Taiping, Jiangyou, in Jiangyou, Sichuan
Taiping, Zizhong County, in Zizhong County, Sichuan
Taiping, Huili County, in Huili County, Sichuan
Taiping, Leshan, in Leshan, Sichuan
Taiping, Tianjin, in Tianjin
Taiping, Yao'an County, in Yao'an County, Yunnan
Taiping, Yingjiang County, in Yingjiang County, Yunnan
Taiping, Shidian County, in Shidian County, Yunnan

Townships in China
Taiping Township, Gansu, in Jingchuan County, Gansu
Taiping Township, Mishan, in Mishan, Heilongjiang
Taiping Township, Wudalianchi, in Wudalianchi, Heilongjiang
Taiping Township, Zhaodong, in Zhaodong, Heilongjiang
Taiping Township, Henan, in Xiayi County, Henan
Taiping Township, Guangshui, a former township in Guangshui, Suizhou, Hubei
Taiping Township, Hefeng County, in Hefeng County, Enshi, Hubei
Taiping Township, Chenzhou, in Chenzhou, Hunan
Taiping Township, Hongjiang, in Hongjiang, Hunan
Taiping Township, Ji'an, Jilin, in Ji'an, Jilin
Taiping Township, Yongji County, Jilin, in Yongji County, Jilin
Taiping Township, Changtu County, in Changtu County, Liaoning
Taiping Township, Fuxin County, in Fuxin Mongol Autonomous County, Liaoning
Taiping Township, Shandong, in Dongying, Shandong
Taiping Township, Anyue County, in Anyue County, Sichuan
Taiping Township, Mao County, in Mao County, Sichuan
Taiping Township, Mianyang, in Mianyang, Sichuan
Taiping Township, Panzhihua, in Panzhihua, Sichuan
Taiping Township, Pingshan County, Sichuan, in Pingshan County, Sichuan
Taiping Township, Zhongjiang County, in Zhongjiang County, Sichuan
Taiping Township, Yunnan, in Yangbi Yi Autonomous County, Yunnan
Taiping Township, Zhejiang, in Lishui, Zhejiang
 Taiping, Hongjiang (太平乡), a township of Hongjiang City, Hunan.

Other uses
 Taipingjing, Taoist "Scriptures of the Great Peace"
 China Taiping Insurance Holdings, a Chinese insurance conglomerate 
 Harbin Taiping International Airport, an airport in Harbin, Heilongjiang, China
 Tai Ping Estate, a public housing estate in Sheung Shui, Hong Kong

See also
Tai Ping Shan (disambiguation)
Taiping Lake (disambiguation)
typing